"Waiting For The Summer" is a song written and recorded by UK outfit Delirious?. The song was the first radio single released in support of the band's 2001 studio album, Audio Lessonover?. The song also appears on the United States version of the album, entitled Touch, but is a different version than its UK counterpart. The single peaked at #26 on the UK Singles Chart.

Track listing
CD1
"Waiting For The Summer" (Radio Edit)
"Show Me Heaven"
"Waiting For The Summer" (Stu Garage Re:mix)

CD2
"Waiting For The Summer" (Album Version)
"Waiting For The Summer" (The dba Mix)
"Waiting For The Summer" CD-ROM Music Video

Chart performance

External links
Official music video on YouTube

2001 singles
Delirious? songs
2001 songs
Songs written by Martin Smith (English musician)
Songs written by Stu G